The Young Academy of Scotland is a Scottish organization of young people from the sciences humanities, professions, arts, business and civil society.  It was established by the Royal Society of Edinburgh in 2011.

The members (equal numbers of women and men in their 20s to 40s) aim to provide ideas and direction for challenges facing Scotland. Membership is generally for 5 years, with selection from applications every two years. In 2021 there were 134 members. Current members include Edinburgh University Rector Deborah Kayembe and former Rector Peter McColl.

Current work 
The Young Academy of Scotland initiatives have ranged from policy advice on Brexit, to promoting diversity multiculturalism in Scotland, enhancing inclusion in the workforce, undertaking outreach in local schools to engage young people in science and developing educational resources such as YouTube videos to improve numerical literacy.

In 2019, the Academy started the  Mosul Bookbridge Project to help the University of Mosul in Iraq rebuild its library, which was destroyed during the ISIS insurgency in 2014.

References

External links 

National academies of arts and humanities
Learned societies of Scotland
Organizations established in 2011
2011 establishments in Scotland